Kateřina Beránková (born 12 October 1977 in Brno) is a Czech former pair skater and single skater. Initially, she competed in ladies' singles, finishing 10th at the 1995 European Championships. She switched to pair skating in 1997 and competed with Otto Dlabola, with whom she finished 8th at the 2002 Winter Olympics. On 20 January 2005 Beránková and Dlabola announced their retirement from competition.

Programs 
(with Dlabola)

Results
GP: Champions Series / Grand Prix

Pairs with Dlabola

Ladies' singles

References

External links 
 

Czech female pair skaters
Czech female single skaters
Olympic figure skaters of the Czech Republic
Figure skaters at the 1998 Winter Olympics
Figure skaters at the 2002 Winter Olympics
1977 births
Living people
Figure skaters from Brno